A film remake is a film based on a previous production.

The concept is popular with film studios and production companies because it reduces the financial risks, as fans of the original work are likely to want to see something similar to the film they already like. In some cases, the producer or studio which made the original film still retains the film rights, so doesn't require a new film option or need to develop a new story, reducing the financial cost.

Remakes are sometimes near copies, such as Psycho (1998), a shot-for-shot remake of Psycho (1960). More frequently they introduce some changes or new elements e.g. in the original The Front Page (1931), a male newspaper editor tries to keep his male star reporter from quitting; in the remake His Girl Friday (1940), the reporter is female and the editor's ex-wife. Black Caesar (1973) is a blaxploitation retelling of Little Caesar (1931).

Technological advances can allow a remake to include features that were not possible at the time the original was made. A silent film can be remade as a "talkie", a black-and-white movie can be remade in color, or a 2D motion picture can be remade as a 3D film. Several animated films have been remade as live-action productions, such as Alice in Wonderland (2010) and Cinderella (2015).

Remakes can be made in different languages or retell an existing story in a new setting. The English-language color film The Magnificent Seven (1960) is a remake of the Japanese-language black & white film Seven Samurai (1954), transferring the story from Sengoku period Japan to the American Wild West. Musical remakes have been attempted, though generally unsuccessfully, such as Lost Horizon (1973), a musical fantasy version of Lost Horizon (1937), originally a drama.

Examples
 List of film remakes (A–M)
 List of film remakes (N–Z)
 List of English-language films with previous foreign-language film versions
 List of Disney live-action remakes of animated films

References